In the physics of continuous media, spatial dispersion is a phenomenon where material parameters such as permittivity or conductivity have dependence on wavevector. Normally, such a dependence is assumed to be absent for simplicity, however spatial dispersion exists to varying degrees in all materials.

Spatial dispersion can be compared to temporal dispersion, the latter often just called dispersion. Temporal dispersion represents memory effects in systems, commonly seen in optics and electronics. Spatial dispersion on the other hand represents spreading effects and is usually significant only at microscopic length scales. Spatial dispersion contributes relatively small perturbations to optics, giving weak effects such as optical activity. Spatial dispersion and temporal dispersion may occur in the same system.

Origin: nonlocal response 

The origin of spatial dispersion is nonlocal response, where response to a force field appears at many locations, and can appear even in locations where the force is zero. This usually arises due to a spreading of effects by the hidden microscopic degrees of freedom.

As an example, consider the current  that is driven in response to an electric field , which is varying in space (x) and time (t). Simplified laws such as Ohm's law would say that these are directly proportional to each other, but this breaks down if the system has memory (temporal dispersion) or spreading (spatial dispersion). The most general linear response is given by:

where  is the nonlocal conductivity function.

If the system is invariant in time (time translation symmetry) and invariant in space (space translation symmetry), then we can simplify because  for some convolution kernel .

which yields a remarkably simple relationship between the two plane waves' complex amplitudes:

where the function  is given by a Fourier transform of the space-time response function:

The conductivity function  has spatial dispersion if it is dependent on the wavevector k. This occurs if the spatial function  is not pointlike (delta function) response in x-x' .

Spatial dispersion in electromagnetism 

In electromagnetism, spatial dispersion plays a role in a few material effects such as optical activity and doppler broadening. Spatial dispersion also plays an important role in the understanding of electromagnetic metamaterials. Most commonly, the spatial dispersion in permittivity ε is of interest.

Crystal optics 

Inside crystals there may be a combination of spatial dispersion, temporal dispersion, and anisotropy. The constitutive relation for the polarization vector can be written as:

i.e., the permittivity is a wavevector- and frequency-dependent tensor.

Considering Maxwell's equations, one can find the plane wave normal modes inside such crystals. These occur when the following relationship is satisfied for a nonzero electric field vector :

Spatial dispersion in  can lead to strange phenomena, such as the existence of multiple modes at the same frequency and wavevector direction, but with different wavevector magnitudes.

Nearby crystal surfaces and boundaries, it is no longer valid to describe system response in terms of wavevectors. For a full description it is necessary to return to a full nonlocal response function (without translational symmetry), however the end effect can sometimes be described by "additional boundary conditions" (ABC's).

In isotropic media 

In materials that have no relevant crystalline structure, spatial dispersion can be important.

Although symmetry demands that the permittivity is isotropic for zero wavevector, this restriction does not apply for nonzero wavevector. The non-isotropic permittivity for nonzero wavevector leads to effects such as optical activity in solutions of chiral molecules. In isotropic materials without optical activity, the permittivity tensor can be broken down to transverse and longitudinal components, referring to the response to electric fields either perpendicular or parallel to the wavevector.

For frequencies nearby an absorption line (e.g., an exciton), spatial dispersion can play an important role.

Landau damping 

In plasma physics, a wave can be collisionlessly damped by particles in the plasma whose velocity matches the wave's phase velocity. This is typically represented as a spatially dispersive loss in the plasma's permittivity.

Permittivity–permeability ambiguity at nonzero frequency 

At nonzero frequencies, it is possible to represent all magnetizations as time-varying polarizations.

What this means is that at nonzero frequency, any contribution to permeability μ can instead be alternatively represented by a spatially dispersive contribution to permittivity ε. The values of the permeability and permittivity are different in this alternative representation, however this leads to no observable differences in real quantities such as electric field, magnetic flux density, magnetic moments, and current.

As a result, it is most common at optical frequencies to set μ to the vacuum permeability μ0 and only consider a dispersive permittivity ε. There is some discussion over whether this is appropriate in metamaterials where effective medium approximations for μ are used, and debate over the reality of "negative permeability" seen in negative index metamaterials.

Spatial dispersion in acoustics 

In acoustics, especially in solids, spatial dispersion can be significant for wavelengths comparable to the lattice spacing, which typically occurs at very high frequencies (gigahertz and above).

In solids, the difference in propagation for transverse acoustic modes and longitudinal acoustic modes of sound is due to a spatial dispersion in the elasticity tensor which relates stress and strain. For polar vibrations (optical phonons), the distinction between longitudinal and transverse modes can be seen as a spatial dispersion in the restoring forces, from the "hidden" non-mechanical degree of freedom that is the electromagnetic field.

Many electromagnetic wave effects from spatial dispersion find an analogue in acoustic waves. For example, there is acoustical activity — the rotation of the polarization plane of transverse sound waves — in chiral materials, analogous to optical activity.

References

Physical phenomena